Stanislav Alshevsky (born 9 May 1991) is a Russian professional ice hockey player. He is currently playing with Neftyanik Almetievsk of the Supreme Hockey League (VHL). He is a teammate with his twin brother, Yaroslav Alshevsky.

Alshevsky made his Kontinental Hockey League (KHL) debut playing with HC Neftekhimik Nizhnekamsk during the 2012–13 KHL season.

References

External links
 

1991 births
Living people
Admiral Vladivostok players
Ariada Volzhsk players
Dizel Penza players
HC Kunlun Red Star players
HC Neftekhimik Nizhnekamsk players
Neftyanik Almetyevsk players
Russian ice hockey forwards
Saryarka Karagandy players
Twin sportspeople